Crash The Calm is an American Post-Hardcore band from Long Island, New York, United States. The band's debut full length How've You Been? was released on May 19, 2017, on Downport Records. The band is currently releasing a three part concept record, titled A Town Named Nowhere.

Background and debut release
Crash The Calm was formed in late 2014. After releasing their debut single "Holes"- produced by Phil Douglas of Iron Chic and Latterman in 2015- the band steadily performed and toured throughout the year before catching the eye of Long Island-based Downport Records. The band began recording their debut full length at VuDu Studios with Mike Watts, Nick Starrantino and Dom Nastasi. How've You Been? was released on May 19, 2017. The band then released a split with Long Island Post-Hardcore band Staleworth on August 10, 2018, also on Downport Records.

A Town Named Nowhere 
The band entered the studio again in May 2019 at Westfall Recordings with Anthony Lopardo and Ray Marte for their follow up release. In October 2020, they released the single "Devils" and announced the upcoming LP A Town Named Nowhere, a concept record about a town during the dust bowl era in the United States. Brooklyn Vegan premiered the music video for the lead single, 'My Nowhere', directed by James Morano, on July 21, 2021, calling it "...a cross between the heavier Manchester Orchestra songs and Balance and Composure." The band says that it is "a song about being addicted to your own tragedy". The first EP, Volume I of A Town Named Nowhere was released on digital streaming platforms July 23, 2021, containing the tracks 'Spring '31', 'Dust & Dirt', 'Devils', and 'My Nowhere'.

Discography
2017: How've You Been?
2018: Split EP with Staleworth
2020: Devils (Single)
2021: A Town Named Nowhere: Volume I

Members
Brian Dowling - Vocals, Guitar (2014–present)
Pat Smith - Guitar (2014–present)
John Potocnik - Drums (2019-present)
Dan LeBrun - Guitar, Vocals (2019-present)
Dave Van Nostrand - Bass (2020-present)
Connor Holzmann - Guitar (2014–2019)
Ryan Sweeney - Bass (2014–2019)
Matt Bodt - Drums (2014–2019)

References

Musical groups established in 2014
Rock music groups from New York (state)
Musical groups from Long Island
2014 establishments in New York (state)